Muhammad Yaqoob Nadeem Sethi is a Pakistani politician who was a Member of the Provincial Assembly of the Punjab, from 2008 to May 2018.

Early life and education
He was born on 5 July 1970 in Kasur.

He graduated from Government Islamia Degree College.

Political career
He ran for the seat of the Provincial Assembly of the Punjab as a candidate of Pakistan Muslim League (N) (PML-N) from Constituency PP-175 (Kasur-I) in 2002 Pakistani general election but was unsuccessful. He received 18,547 votes and lost the seat to Muhammad Ilyas Khan, an independent candidate.

He was elected to the Provincial Assembly of the Punjab as a candidate of PML-N from Constituency PP-175 (Kasur-I) in 2008 Pakistani general election. He received 20,032 votes and defeated Muhammad Ilyas Khan, a candidate of Pakistan Muslim League (Q).

He was re-elected to the Provincial Assembly of the Punjab as a candidate of PML-N from Constituency PP-175 (Kasur-I) in 2013 Pakistani general election.

References

Living people
Punjab MPAs 2013–2018
Punjab MPAs 2008–2013
1970 births
Pakistan Muslim League (N) politicians